In Greek mythology, Carmanor or Karmanor (Ancient Greek: Καρμάνωρ Karmánōr) was a Cretan priest who purified Apollo after he killed the Delphic dragon Python. He was the father of two sons Euboulus and Chrysothemis. According to Walter Burkert the name Carmanor "does not appear to be Greek".

Mythology 
According to second-century geographer Pausanias, when Apollo and Artemis had killed Python, the dragon at Delphi, they came to Carmanor in Crete to be purified, and it was in Carmanor's house in Tarrha that Apollo mated with Acacallis, producing the offspring Phylacides and Philander.

Carmanor had two sons, according to Pausanias, Euboulus, whose daughter Carme was the mother, by Zeus, of Britomartis, and the poet Chrysothemis, who was said to have won the victory in the first competition—the singing of a hymn to Apollo—held at the Pythian games at Delphi.

He had another child with the goddess Demeter, a daughter also named Chrysothemis, which may refer to known as the attributes of the golden harvest as an agricultural demi-goddess.

Notes

References 
 Burkert, Walter, The Orientalizing Revolution: Near Eastern Influence on Greek Culture in the Early Archaic Age, translated by	Walter Burkert, Margaret E. Pinder, Harvard University Press, 1995. .
 Celoria, Francis, The Metamorphoses of Antoninus Liberalis: A Translation with a Commentary, Routledge 1992. .
 Cook, Arthur Bernard, Zeus: A Study in Ancient Religion, Volume II: Zeus God of the Dark Sky (Thunder and Lightning), Part I: Text and Notes, Cambridge University Press 1925. Internet Archive
 Diodorus Siculus, Library of History, Volume III: Books 4.59-8. Translated by C. H. Oldfather. Loeb Classical Library No. 340. Cambridge, Massachusetts: Harvard University Press, 1939. . Online version by Bill Thayer
 Grimal, Pierre, The Dictionary of Classical Mythology, Wiley-Blackwell, 1996. .
 Pausanias, Pausanias Description of Greece with an English Translation by W.H.S. Jones, Litt.D., and H.A. Ormerod, M.A., in 4 Volumes. Cambridge, Massachusetts, Harvard University Press; London, William Heinemann Ltd. 1918. Online version at the Perseus Digital Library.
 Smith, William; Dictionary of Greek and Roman Biography and Mythology, London (1873). Online version at the Perseus Digital Library

Cretan characters in Greek mythology
Deeds of Apollo
Deeds of Artemis
Consorts of Demeter